Broad sheet is a type of hand-blown glass. It was first made in Sussex in 1226.

Production 
It is made by blowing molten glass into an elongated tube shape with a blowpipe. Then, while the glass is still hot, the ends are cut off and the resulting cylinder is split with shears and flattened on an iron plate. The quality of broad sheet glass is not good, with many imperfections and mostly translucent. Due to the relatively small sizes blown, broad sheet was typically made into leadlights. The centerpiece was used for decoration in places where looking through the glass wasn't vital. If the piece was large, it was possible to see bubble tracks and strain lines.

Other methods for making hand-blown glass included blown plate glass, crown glass (introduced to England in the 17th century), polished plate glass and cylinder blown sheet glass. These methods of manufacture lasted at least until the end of the 19th century. The early 20th century marks the move away from hand-blown to machine manufactured glass such as rolled plate glass, machine drawn cylinder sheet glass, flat drawn sheet glass, single and twin ground polished plate glass and float glass.

Broad sheet glass was first made in the UK in Chiddingfold, Surrey on the border with Sussex in 1226. In 1240 an order was placed for this glass to be used in Westminster Abbey. This glass was of poor quality and fairly opaque. Manufacture slowly decreased and ceased by the early 16th century. The choice of this location may have been due to the availability of sand, the abundance of bracken (the ash of which can be used to make potash for soda glass) and the significant beech forests to provide charcoal as fuel for the kiln.  Examples of glass from this area can be found in Guildford Museum.

Whilst French glass-makers and others were making broad sheet glass earlier than this notably William Le Verrier, Schurterrers and John Alemayne. Between 1350 and 1356 Alemayne secured orders for glass to be used in St. Stephens Chapel, Westminster and St Georges Chapel, Windsor.

References

Glass production